The following is the list of episodes of the MSNBC documentary TV series, Lockup.

Series overview

Episodes

Season 1 (2005–06)

Season 2 (2006)

Season 3 (2007)

Season 4 (2008–09)

Season 5 (2009)

Season 6 (2010)

Season 7 (2010)

Season 8 (2010)

Season 9 (2010–11)

Season 10 (2011)

Season 11 (2011)

Season 12 (2012)

Season 13 (2012)

Season 14 (2012)

Season 15 (2013)

Season 16 (2013)

Season 17 (2014)

Season 18 (2014)

Season 19 (2014)

Season 20 (2014)

Season 21 (2015)

Season 22 (2015)

Season 23 (2015)

Season 24 (2015)

Season 25 (2017)

External links
44 Blue Productions website
Series page at 44 Blue Productions
Series page at MSNBC

Lockup episodes